Hormonally Yours is the second studio album by British pop-rock act Shakespears Sister, released on 17 February 1992 by London Records. The album went on to become a critical and commercial success, and is their best-selling album to date. Hormonally Yours peaked at No. 3 on the UK Albums Chart and has been certified double platinum by the BPI, spending 55 weeks on the chart. The album spawned five singles, three of which reached the UK top 20. The album's second single, "Stay" became the group's best-selling single, topping the UK Singles Chart for eight consecutive weeks. It also peaked at number four on the US Billboard Hot 100.

Background 

The title of Hormonally Yours derived from both members being pregnant while making the album. Five singles were released from the album, including "Stay", which topped the UK Singles Chart, and is to date the group's best-selling single. An early cassette pressing of the album featured an alternate cover and font previously used on the "Goodbye Cruel World" single. Some versions like the German edition of the album appears to contain a straight mix of "Are We in Love Yet" similar to the BBC Radio live session while others feature the Chris Thomas remix, though he is credited in all releases. The UK CD version of 'Hormonally Yours' contains the 7" versions of "Goodbye Cruel World", "I Don't Care", and "Hello (Turn Your Radio On)" while the LP and MC versions contain the original album versions. The US pressing of the album also differed greatly, featuring the album versions of "Goodbye Cruel World", "I Don't Care" and "Hello (Turn Your Radio On)", another remixed version of "Are We in Love Yet", and slightly different versions of "Black Sky" and "The Trouble With Andre" with "Black Sky" not segueing into "The Trouble With Andre" like other pressings as well as a shorter version of "The Trouble With Andre" and the extended version of "Let Me Entertain You", as well as featuring a different cover on the CD edition with the titles being vertical like the cassette pressings.

While recording the album, the band watched the 1950s sci-fi B-movie Cat-Women of the Moon and it inspired the lyrics of the songs "Stay", "Catwoman" and "Moonchild".

The album was released as part of a multi-disc, remastered reissue (also on vinyl) as part of the Our History deluxe box set in December 2020.

Critical reception 

Tom Demalon from AllMusic praised the album, calling Hormonally Yours "a beautifully quirky, emotionally rich, and nearly flawless pop record", and saying that "It's a vibe that benefits from the contrast between the throaty vocals of Siobahn Fahey and the falsetto flutter of Marcella Detroit. Hormonally Yours is a wonderful, charming album marred only by a few weak lyrics." Gina Arnold of Entertainment Weekly said "Hormonally Yours plays on the idea of female biological madness, and to its credit, it does so without sounding bitchy or melodramatic. Unlike band member Siobhan Fahey's former group, Bananarama, Shakespear's Sis isn't afraid to emote." She also complimented the duo's vocals, saying that " Fahey's deep, uncannily male-sounding voice is perfectly complemented by her American-born partner, Marcella Detroit, who adds more soulful and feminine R&B-influenced backup vocals." Everett True of Melody Maker described it as "often a highly entertaining album of musical pastiche". He was critical of some tracks where the duo "allow grey into their spangled, shiny world to lend 'rock authenticity' to their pop toy", adding that they "forget themselves and pretend they're some kind of female rock retake on Robert Palmer or Bryan Adams". Betty Page of NME felt the duo wanted to "emulate their male rock star heroes rather than carve out their own uniquely feminine niche". She commented, "There's nothing truly contemporary here, nothing truly surprising or startling. Just a strangely misplaced desire to be glam rock muthas. It's like Marcella wants to be Bowie, Siobhan wants to be Bolan, haunted by the ghost of Dave Stewart's guitar."

Singles 
"Goodbye Cruel World" was released in October 1991 as the album's lead single, though it failed to reach the UK Top 40, peaking at No. 59. In July 1992, the single was re-released and charted better, peaking at No. 32. Neither releases were fully released outside of the UK. The second single, "Stay", was released in January 1992. It quickly became the group's best-selling single, topping the UK Singles Chart for eight consecutive weeks, and was certified Gold by the British Phonographic Industry. The single reached similar success internationally, reaching the top 5 in territories including Australia, the US, and Germany. It also reached No. 1 in Ireland and Switzerland.

The third single from Hormonally Yours, "I Don't Care", reached No. 7 in the UK, and No. 10 in Ireland. Internationally, the single reached the top 20 in Australia and New Zealand, and No. 55 in the US. The fourth single, "Hello (Turn Your Radio On)", reached No. 14 in the UK, and peaked at No. 97 in Australia on the ARIA singles chart. The song was covered less than two years later by The Bates, and released as the band's debut single. Although this version gained little attention, the song was covered once again by Queensberry in 2009, and in several territories was more successful than the original. The fifth and final single, "My 16th Apology", was released during a period of hiatus, and due to a lack of promotion only peaked at No. 61 in the UK.

Track listing 
UK CD version

Personnel 
Adapted from album booklet.
Siobhan Fahey – vocals
Marcella Detroit– vocals, guitars, programming, harmonica
Mick Cozzi – guitars
Ed Shearmur, Jonathan Perkins – keyboards
Ian aka Jennifer Maidman – bass, piano, keyboards, guitar.
Steve Ferrera – drums, percussion, keyboards

Charts

Weekly charts

Year-end charts

Certifications

Hormonally Yours video compilation 

A video compilation was released in 1992 of the same name as the album. It featured the five music videos released so far from the album.

Track listing

References

1992 albums
Shakespears Sister albums
Albums produced by Alan Moulder
Albums recorded at FPSHOT